Alexander McDonald (November 1, 1876 – November 20, 1945) was a Canadian politician. He served in the Legislative Assembly of British Columbia from 1933 to 1937  from the electoral district of The Islands, a member of the Liberal party.

References

1876 births
1945 deaths